In mathematics, a topological abelian group, or TAG, is a topological group that is also an abelian group.
That is, a TAG is both a group and a topological space, the group operations are continuous, and the group's binary operation is commutative.

The theory of topological groups applies also to TAGs, but more can be done with TAGs. Locally compact TAGs, in particular, are used heavily in harmonic analysis.

See also

 
 
 
 
 
 
 
 
 , a topological abelian group that is compact and connected

References

 
Fourier analysis on Groups, by Walter Rudin.

Abelian group theory
Topology
Topological groups